Fluvalinate is a synthetic pyrethroid chemical compound contained as an active agent in the products Apistan, Klartan, and Minadox, that is an acaricide (specifically, a miticide), commonly used to control Varroa mites in honey bee colonies, infestations that constitute a significant disease of such insects.

Fluvalinate is a stable, nonvolatile, viscous, heavy oil (technical) soluble in organic solvents. 
Although the compound may be found in drones, a study has found honey samples virtually absent of fluvalinate, on account of its affinity to beeswax.

Stereoisomerism 
Fluvalinate is synthesized from racemic valine [(RS)-valine], the synthesis is not diastereoselective. Thus, fluvalinate is a mixture of four stereoisomers, each about 25%.

Tau-fluvalinate (τ-fluvalinate) is the trivial name for (2R)-fluvalinate. The C atom in the valinate structure is in (R)-absolute configuration, while the second chiral atom is a mixture of (R)- and (S)-configurations:

See also 
 
 Diseases of the honey bee

References

Further reading

External links 
 EPA: Tau-fluvalinate; Reregistration Eligibility Decision for Low Risk Pesticide; Notice of Availability
 
 

Pyrethroids
Chloroarenes
Trifluoromethyl compounds
Nitriles
Phenol ethers
Cyanohydrin esters